The year 2006 is the 14th year in the history of Pancrase, a mixed martial arts promotion based in Japan. In 2006 Pancrase held 14 events beginning with Pancrase: Blow 1.

Title fights

Events list

Pancrase: Blow 1

Pancrase: Blow 1 was an event held on January 26, 2006 at Korakuen Hall in Tokyo, Japan.

Results

Pancrase: 2006 Neo-Blood Tournament Eliminations

Pancrase: 2006 Neo-Blood Tournament Eliminations was an event held on February 19, 2006 at Gold's Gym South Tokyo Annex in Tokyo, Japan.

Results

Pancrase: Blow 2

Pancrase: Blow 2 was an event held on March 19, 2006 at Umeda Stella Hall in Osaka, Osaka, Japan.

Results

Pancrase: 2006 Neo-Blood Tournament Semifinals

Pancrase: 2006 Neo-Blood Tournament Semifinals was an event held on April 2, 2006 at Gold's Gym South Tokyo Annex in Tokyo, Japan.

Results

Pancrase: Blow 3

Pancrase: Blow 3 was an event held on April 9, 2006 at Differ Ariake Arena in Tokyo, Japan.

Results

Pancrase: Blow 4

Pancrase: Blow 4 was an event held on May 2, 2006 at Korakuen Hall in Tokyo, Japan.

Results

Pancrase: Blow 5

Pancrase: Blow 5 was an event held on June 6, 2006 at Korakuen Hall in Tokyo, Japan.

Results

Pancrase: 2006 Neo-Blood Tournament Finals

Pancrase: 2006 Neo-Blood Tournament Finals was an event held on July 28, 2006 at Korakuen Hall in Tokyo, Japan.

Results

Pancrase: Blow 6

Pancrase: Blow 6 was an event held on August 27, 2006 at Yokohama Cultural Gymnasium in Yokohama, Kanagawa, Japan.

Results

Pancrase: Blow 7

Pancrase: Blow 7 was an event held on September 16, 2006 at Differ Ariake Arena in Tokyo, Japan.

Results

Pancrase: Blow 8

Pancrase: Blow 8 was an event held on October 1, 2006 at Umeda Stella Hall in Osaka, Osaka, Japan.

Results

Pancrase: Blow 9

Pancrase: Blow 9 was an event held on October 25, 2006 at Korakuen Hall in Tokyo, Japan.

Results

Pancrase: Blow 10

Pancrase: Blow 10 was an event held on December 2, 2006 at Differ Ariake Arena in Tokyo, Japan.

Results

Pancrase: Blow 11

Pancrase: Blow 11 was an event held on December 10, 2006 at Differ Ariake Arena in Tokyo, Japan.

Results

See also 
 List of Pancrase champions
 List of Pancrase events

References

Pancrase events
2006 in mixed martial arts